Sin Yaw Mg Mg or Zinyaw Maung Maung is Burmese film director and film producer. His 2004 film Hlyo-hwat-thaw-hnin or Mystery of Snow was released internationally.

Biography
His real name is U Lyn Aung. He is son of  U Kan Htoo and Daw Khin Ti. He lived at No. 6-A, Myaynigone Plaza, Bargayar Street, Sanchaung Township, Yangon, Myanmar, near the Dagon Center. He was awarded a M.Sc. degree in mathematics in 1983, from the University of Yangon. He entered into the film business as a production manager in 1983, with the film The Second Heartbreak of the Third Age. He became famous with the video Maung (Darling). Between 1989 and 1995, he acted as treasurer, joint secretary and as general secretary for the Myanmar Motion Picture Organization (MMPO).

He married Daw Than Than Sint (aka) May Than Nu, a Myanmar film actress. They have a son together named Min Thant Mg Mg, born on July 3, 1997.

Filmography

Film
Rain Fall In The Orbit Dear NYO 1992
The Foreign Citizen, Miss HTA 1993
The Missing Recorded in the History of Heart 1993
Beyond the Summer 1994
Too Cruel Forming Hatred? 1995
Don't Hate of the Ngapali 1999
Another Side of love 2001
Mystery of Snow 2004
The Moon Lotus (Pann Kyar Wutt Hmone) 2011
Eternal Mother (2017 Myanmar Film)

Video
Please do not hesitate darling
Maung(Darling)
Never will take revenge
To a farther place
Even the greatest ocean has a boundary bank
The lighted lamp at the ceiling sky
River Irrawaddy, the supreme witness
King Lions' forces (power) which will rise up to the sky
Light Web
The unmitigated golden country surrounded by the shining stars
The winter which destroys Monsoon winds
Home returning of birds flying against wind current
Could not forget

VCD
The journey of Too Big
Never ending

DVD
Symbols of Dramatic Myanmar

See also
Sin Yaw Film Production

References

External links

Year of birth missing (living people)
Living people
Burmese film directors
Burmese film producers
University of Yangon alumni
People from Yangon